The men's 200 metre breaststroke event at the 2000 Summer Olympics took place on 19–20 September at the Sydney International Aquatic Centre in Sydney, Australia.

Domenico Fioravanti emerged as a major force on the international swimming after effortlessly winning his second gold at these Games. He maintained a lead from start to finish and posted a European record of 2:10.87, the second-fastest of all time, making him the first ever swimmer in Olympic history to strike a breaststroke double. South Africa's Terence Parkin, a deaf mute since birth, enjoyed the race of his life to take a silver medal in an African record of 2:12.50. Fioravanti's fellowman Davide Rummolo gave Italy a further reason to celebrate, as he powered home with the bronze in 2:12.73.

Acknowledging a massive cheer from the home crowd, Australia's Regan Harrison swam his lifetime best, but finished outside the podium by 15-hundredths of a second in 2:12.88. Czech Republic's Daniel Málek pulled off a fifth-place finish in a national record of 2:13.20, while Kyle Salyards, the only U.S. swimmer in the final, earned a sixth spot with a time of 2:13.27. France's Yohann Bernard (2:13.31) and another Aussie Ryan Mitchell (2:14.00) rounded out the finale. Notable swimmers failed to reach the top 8 final, featuring Hungary's Norbert Rózsa, the defending Olympic champion, who placed thirteenth (2:14.67), and Canada's Morgan Knabe, who had the fastest 100-metre split, but faded badly on the final lap to place tenth (2:14.01).

Shortly before the next Olympics, Fioravanti was forced to retire from swimming after failing a routine medical test carried by the Italian National Olympic Committee. Tests revealed that he was diagnosed with a genetic heart anomaly.

Records
Prior to this competition, the existing world and Olympic records were as follows.

Results

Heats

Semifinals

Semifinal 1

Semifinal 2

Final

References

External links
Official Olympic Report

B
Men's events at the 2000 Summer Olympics